Johan Capiot (born 12 April 1964 in Rijkhoven, Belgium) is a former professional road racing cyclist. He was a professional rider from 1986 to 2000.

Major results

1986
1st, Stage 3, Danmark Rundt
1987
1st, Veenendaal–Veenendaal
1st, Stage 1, Tour de l'Oise
1988
1st, Brabantse Pijl
1st, Stages 1 and 5, Tour de Luxembourg
1st, Stage 1, Tour of Belgium
1989
1st, Brabantse Pijl
1st, Grand Prix de la Libération
1990
1st, Omloop "Het Volk"
1991
1st, Paris–Tours
1st, Stage 8, Four Days of Dunkirk
1992
1st, Brabantse Pijl
1st, Omloop "Het Volk"
1st, Le Samyn
1st, Trophée de l'Etna
1st, Nokere Koerse
1st, Overall, Ronde van Midden-Zeeland
1st, Stage 2, Tour de l'Oise
1993
1st, Stage 3, Tour de l'Oise
1st, Stage 3, Tour de Luxembourg
1994
1st, Le Samyn
1st, Clásica de Almería
1995
1st, Le Samyn
1996
1st, A Travers le Morbihan
1st, Omloop van het Houtland
1998
1st, Stage 5, Vuelta a Murcia

External links
Palmarès by VeloPalmares 

Living people
1964 births
Belgian male cyclists
People from Bilzen
Cyclists from Limburg (Belgium)